Happening is a song by Danish singer Medina from her second English studio album Forever. The song is the English version of her Danish song "Kl. 10" from her third Danish album "For altid". It was released as the second single from the album on 14 September 2012. "Happening" was written by Medina Valbak, Rasmus Stabell, Jeppe Federspiel and Ross Golan, and was produced by the Danish producer-team Providers.

Background and inspiration
In a video interview about the song Medina stated that "[...] It's about meeting someone, he is unfaithful with his girlfriend, and I'm waiting for him to break-up with her, and he keeps promising me that in 10 o'clock or in this English version it's 2 am, he's gonna break up with her, so it's basically me waiting for him to do it, so him and I can be together forever".

Music video
The music video for the single was filmed in early August. The video premiered on 5 September 2012 on her official myvideo.de channel and a day later on the label's YouTube channel.

Live performances
Medina performed the song on 1 September 2012 at the box fight of the world champion Felix Sturm against Daniel Gaele, that was aired live on Sat 1. She also performed the song on 15 September 2012 at the "SWR3 New Pop Festival" in Baden-Baden.

Track listing

Amazon.de digital download (Germany)
"Happening" (Radio Edit) – 3:09
"Happening" (Ronen Dahan Remix) – 5:38
"Happening" (Get No Sleep Collective Remix)– 5:48

iTunes digital download
"Happening" (Radio Edit) – 3:09
"Happening" (Decalicious Remix) – 4:15
"Happening" (Granity Remix) – 4:02
"Happening" (Ronen Dahan Remix) – 5:38
"Happening" (Get No Sleep Collective Remix)– 5:48

Charts

Personnel
Songwriting – Medina Valbak, Rasmus Stabell, Jeppe Federspiel, Ross Golan
Production and instruments – Providers
Vocals – Medina
Mixing and mastering – Anders Schuman, Providers

Source:

Release history

References

2012 singles
Synth-pop ballads
Medina (singer) songs
2012 songs
Songs written by Jeppe Federspiel
Songs written by Rasmus Stabell
EMI Records singles
Songs written by Ross Golan
Songs written by Medina (singer)